Moses Chesley was an American politician from Maine. Chesley, a Greenback from Oxford, Maine, served one term in the Maine House of Representatives (1880). He was one of eight state representatives in 1880 from Oxford County.

References

Year of birth missing
Year of death missing
People from Oxford, Maine
Maine Greenbacks
Members of the Maine House of Representatives